Toyda 2-ya is a rural locality (a settlement) in Oktyabrskoye Rural Settlement, Paninsky District, Voronezh Oblast, Russia. The population was 82 as of 2010. There are 2 streets.

Geography 
Toyda 2-ya is located 19 km south of Panino (the district's administrative centre) by road. Toyda is the nearest rural locality.

References 

Rural localities in Paninsky District